Pandora's Box (Chinese: 天目危机) is a 2021 mystery drama.  It was filmed in 2019. Initially to be aired on August 18, 2021, the airing was postponed to August 25, 2021, on Mango TV every Wednesday and Thursday.

Synopsis
Physics genius Li Tian (Ray Zhang Rui) is focused on his investigation of a special type of energy. However, his mother Mei Xue Yan, a famous musician, gets embroiled in a mysterious car accident in Japan. Li Tian heads to Japan alone, but he never expected to fall into an intricate trap set up by a crime organisation. The man behind the scene manipulate Li Tian and uses advanced technology to commit a series of crimes. In Japan, Li Tian meets the bubbly Zhang Ni (He Dujuan), as well as the investigation officer responsible for the case - Yamazaki Dachang (Michael Miu). The three of them form a special investigation team and traces the incident back to a mysterious band twenty years ago. They also found Fu Bu Jie (Joseph Chang), a reporter who has been investigating the band for many years. A huge conspiracy which links back to a dark secret involving Li Tian's parents awaits them.

Cast

Main cast

Production 
Wong Ching-po, the director, took 2.5 years to write the script of the television film. It took the production crew five months to complete the principal photography for the 12 episodes.

Reception 
An advance screening of the first two episodes was held on June 9, 2019, at the China Art Museum as part of the 25th Shanghai Television Festival. The audience reacted favourably throughout the screening.

References

2021 television films
Mango TV original programming
Japan in non-Japanese culture